Ken or KEN may refer to:

Entertainment
 Ken (album), a 2017 album by Canadian indie rock band Destroyer.
 Ken (film), 1964 Japanese film.
 Ken (magazine), a large-format political magazine.
 Ken Masters, a main character in the Street Fighter franchise.

People
 Ken (given name), a list of people named Ken
 Ken (musician) (born 1968), guitarist of the Japanese rock band L'Arc-en-Ciel
 Ken (SB19 musician) (born 1997), stage name of Felip Jhon Suson of the Filipino boy group, SB19
 Ken (VIXX singer) (born 1992), stage name of Lee Jae-hwan of the South Korean boy group, VIXX
 Naoko Ken (born 1953), Japanese singer and actress (Ken as surname)
 Thomas Ken (1637–1711), English cleric and composer
 Tjungkara Ken (born 1969), Aboriginal Australian artist
 Ken Zheng (born April 5, 1995) is an Indonesian actor, screenwriter and martial artist

Other
 Kèn, a musical instrument from Vietnam.
 Ken (doll), a product by Mattel.
 Ken (unit) (間), a Japanese unit of measurement and proportion.
 Ken River, a river in the Bundelkhand region, India.
 Komisja Edukacji Narodowej, Polish National Board of Education.
 Ken (県), meaning "prefecture" in Japanese, see Prefectures of Japan.
 Ken (拳), meaning "fist" in Japanese, see Sansukumi-ken for various hand gesture matching games.
 Ken (Կ կ), the fifteenth letter of the Armenian alphabet.
 KEN (ISO 3166-1 country code for Kenya).
 Kent, county in England, Chapman code.

See also
 Kendall (disambiguation), includes a list of people named Kendall.
 Kenneth, includes a list of people and places named Kenneth or Ken.
 Kenning (disambiguation)
 Kenny (disambiguation), includes a list of people named Kenny.